The Chrysler Sebring is a line of mid-size automobiles that was sold from 1995 through 2010 by Chrysler. Three generations of convertibles, two generations of sedans, and two generations of coupes were produced. Although the coupe shared the same name and some styling cues, it was mechanically unrelated to the other Sebring models.

The Sebring line was introduced in 1995 with the Chrysler Sebring coupe. It was the replacement for the Chrysler LeBaron coupe. In 1996 the convertible was introduced, replacing its LeBaron counterpart as well. For 2001, both body styles were redesigned and a sedan version was offered, replacing the Chrysler Cirrus. The coupe was discontinued after 2005 with no replacement model planned.

The redesigned sedan was introduced for 2007, and a convertible the following year. New options included all-wheel drive on sedans and an available retractable metal top for the convertible. All Sebring models were replaced by the Chrysler 200 for the 2011 model year.

First generation (FJ/JX; 1995)

The Chrysler Sebring was introduced as a coupe for 1995, and as a convertible in 1996, both models replacing the Chrysler LeBaron convertible and coupe. The convertible was built off the Chrysler JA platform also used for the Cirrus sedan, while the coupe was based on the Mitsubishi Eclipse. The Chrysler Sebring was named after Sebring, Florida, the site of the renowned endurance car race called the 12 Hours of Sebring. The name was first used by Chrysler Corporation's Plymouth division trim line of the Satellite mid-size coupe of the 1970s.

Coupe (1995–2000)

The 1995 through 2000 Chrysler Sebring coupe was the successor to the Chrysler LeBaron coupe.

The first generation Sebring coupe was introduced in April 1995, several months after the related Dodge Avenger. Despite its similarities to the Avenger, Chrysler's suspension was tuned slightly on the softer side compared to Dodge's stiff suspension. Although the Sebring did not really offer true "off-the-line" muscle, it did handle well over long, curvy roads, offering minimal body roll. LXi models further benefited from rear sway bars, a slightly different tuned fully independent suspension, along with 17-inch wheels wrapped with Goodyear Eagle performance tires. Recorded slalom speeds proved to be impressive for a car of its class, and were a result of Sebring's 4-wheel double wishbone suspension and variable speed rack and pinion steering; both of which were key contributors to the car's road manners.

The coupe version of the Sebring had seating for five and was considered to be one of the larger, more roomy coupes on the market. Trunk capacity was similar to that of many mid-size cars, capable of handling more than one set of golf clubs. At the time of its introduction, the Sebring sported a crosshair grille, reminiscent of the original Chrysler 300 letter series. The grille was non-functional, with the lower half under the bumper used for airflow intake in a "bottom breather" function.

The Sebring coupe was built on a Mitsubishi Motors platform shared by the Eagle Talon, Mitsubishi Eclipse, Mitsubishi Galant, and Dodge Avenger. They share a great deal with their Talon sibling, including much of their dash and instrument panel along with most mechanical components. Parts of the Sebring coupe cannot interchange with the sedan or convertible, which were not built by Mitsubishi.

The Sebring underwent a minor facelift for 1997. Its grille was replaced with a slightly larger black grid. The facelift also made the Sebring the first car to use Chrysler's "wings" logo. The 1997 restyle also saw the addition of ribbed lower body cladding and new wheel styles. Features offered on Sebring coupes included 4-wheel disc brakes with ABS, adaptive automatic transmissions, and fully independent suspensions, along with a host of power-operated features. Sebring also offered variable speed rack and pinion steering, 17-inch aluminum wheels with Goodyear Eagle tires, 4-wheel double wishbone suspension, one-touch power windows, one-touch moonroof, electrochromic mirror with compass, power accessory delay ignition (which allowed occupants to operate power window switches when the ignition is turned off), and Homelink universal transmitter, among other options. 

The Sebring coupe received a 5-star frontal safety rating, the highest rating possible. First-generation body style coupes continued to be sold past the 2000 model year to select export markets.

Trim levels:
LX — 1995–2000
LXi — 1995–2000

Convertible (1996–2000)

The Chrysler Sebring convertible was launched in 1996 alongside the Sebring coupe, replacing the LeBaron convertible. The convertible did not share any parts with the coupe and was instead based on the Chrysler Cirrus sedan. Consequently, both the Cirrus and the Sebring convertible were sold in Europe as the Stratus. 

All Stratus convertibles were assembled in Mexico. The Chrysler Stratus convertible was marketed in Mexico, but the sedan version was not. The Sebring convertible was sold alongside the Chrysler Stratus convertible in Mexico. In Mexico, a turbocharged 2.4 L DOHC I4 engine was optional.

Trim levels:
JX — 1996–2000
JXi — 1996–2000
JXi Limited — 1998–2000

Second generation (ST-22/JR; 2001) 

The Sebring name was then used on three different cars for 2001: the coupe was based on the Mitsubishi Eclipse, while the sedan and convertible utilized the Chrysler JR platform successors to the Chrysler Cirrus. The 2004 Chrysler Sebring had received minor tweaks to its front end: a redesigned grille, reworked headlights, and a Chrysler winged emblem placed in the center on the rear deck; furthermore, after the 2004 Chrysler Sebring sedan had seen a mild cycle refresh, the company discontinued the Chrysler Sebring coupe after the 2005 model year. Outside of the United States, and Canada, over into Mexico, the Sebring was sold as the Chrysler Cirrus. Exclusive for the Cirrus was the availability of Chrysler's turbocharged 2.4 L DOHC engine. The Cirrus was available as a sedan and convertible body styles. Models with this engine are identified with a "High Output" badge on the back of the vehicle. Also unique to the Cirrus were the trim levels; the sedan was offered in two while the convertible had only one. All were equipped with an automatic transmission.

The Insurance Institute for Highway Safety gives the 2001–2006 Sebring an Acceptable overall rating in frontal crash tests. In the side impact test, a Poor overall rating was given to models without side airbags. The IIHS did not test the Sebring with side airbags since Chrysler declined another test.

Convertible

For 2001, the Sebring Convertible was restyled. It now closely resembled the sedan, and continued to be built on the same platform as the sedan. Many interior and exterior components were carried over from the first-generation car. The Sebring received minor styling revisions (mostly the appearance of the front end) for the 2004 model year.

Coupe

A redesigned Sebring Coupe was introduced for the 2001 model year, based on the third-generation Mitsubishi Eclipse. Like the previous generation, the coupe shared very little in common with the sedan or the convertible, other than the name and a few exterior styling cues to help market all three vehicles together as one model. The Sebring Coupe received a minor facelift for 2003, and was discontinued after the 2005 model year.

The Sebring Coupe was only sold in Canada for the 2001 model year.

European versions

Chrysler also manufactured export versions of the 2001-2006 Sebring sedan and convertible for the mainland European market. Front and rear lights are to European standards, different from the USA & Canada in that turn-signal indicators are orange, with additional side-turn repeaters on the front fenders. The rear bumper has a larger recess for the longer European-size license plates, and two rear fog lamps are fitted; one on each side of the license plate. The LHD headlamps incorporate Euro-type H4 bulbs, together with three-way up and down beam-level adjustment via a dash-mounted switch to the left of the steering wheel. Emissions controls are to the EURO 3 standard; later versions are compliant with EURO 4. Engine ranges offered were the 2.0 L DOHC 16V inline 4-cylinder (later replaced by the 2.4L unit in some countries), and the 2.7 L DOHC 24V 6-cylinder unit. The 2.0 and 2.4L engines are available with the 5-speed manual or four-speed 41TE auto transmission (depending on the country); the six-cylinder engine is automatic only.

The Canadian-market 240 km/h-160 mph speedometer (with km/h predominant) is fitted to the European models. The odometer and trip meter are in kilometers. As the 2001-2006 Sebring sedan and convertible were made in left-hand drive only, they were not sold in the UK and Ireland. Chrysler UK did, however, import 50 convertibles with the 2.7 L engine in 2001/2002, and these were sold through selected dealers. Being non-standard in Chrysler's UK range at the time though, no more were imported.

Trim levels offered in Europe were LE (equivalent to North American market LX) and LX (equivalent to North American market LXi). From 2004, Touring and Limited versions started to replace the LE and LX designations respectively.

The lack of a diesel engine and right-hand drive availability prevented this Sebring from being a true pan-European model unlike other Chryslers such as the Chrysler 300M, PT Cruiser, and Voyager. In addition, the model was dropped from Chrysler's lineup in some countries, notably France, before production ended in 2006. In France, the three domestic car-makers PSA-Peugeot, Citroen, and Renault dominate the new car market, which meant very low sales of the Sebring there. As a result, the sedan was only imported by Chrysler France in 2001 and 2002. The 2003 and facelifted 2004–2006 year models were not. The convertible was only sold until 2004. The 2005 and 2006 models were likewise not imported.

Despite not being available in the UK and Ireland, some Sebring convertibles have been brought in from the U.S. as grey imports. Some Euro-spec models have also been privately imported, mostly from Germany. The European versions are easier to re-register in the UK as they have EU-type approval. The dual km/h-mph speedo-display and twin rear foglights mean only headlamp beam-aim adjustment for left-hand traffic is necessary. The sedan is much rarer in the UK though; a few EU models have been imported, but most are likely from North America as grey imports.

Trim Levels

Base (sedan and convertible 2004–2006) (coupe 2004–2005)
GTC (Convertible 2002–2006)
Limited (sedan 2004–2006) (convertible 2001–2006) (coupe 2004–2005)
LX (sedan and convertible 2001–2004) (coupe 2001–2003)
LXi (sedan and convertible 2001–2004) (coupe 2001–2003) 
Touring (sedan and convertible 2004–2006)
TSi (sedan 2005–2006)

Note: Additional packages could be added to various standard trim levels.

Volga Siber

In 2006, the license, tooling, and assembly line for the second-generation Chrysler Sebring/Dodge Stratus sedan was sold to Russian firm GAZ for about US$151 million (€ 124 million). After some minor modifications the vehicle was renamed the Volga Siber. It went into production in March 2008 at the Gorky Automobile Plant in Nizhny Novgorod, Russia. However, due to the Great Recession sales were not as expected and production ended in 2010 after 9,000 examples were built.

Third generation (JS; 2007) 

The Sebring was replaced with a new model based on the JS platform for the 2007 model year. The third-generation Sebring was assembled in Sterling Heights, Michigan, containing over 82% of parts sourced in North America. Since no 2007 convertible was offered, the 2006 Sebring convertible was left to fill the void, remaining in showrooms and on the company's website until the 2008 model's release. The third-generation Sebring borrowed many styling cues from the 2003 Chrysler Airflite concept. It also has several Chrysler-signature styling cues, several of which were borrowed from the Chrysler Crossfire. The Sebring sedan and convertible were also sold in right-hand drive through Chrysler's UK and Ireland dealer network.

Chrysler offered three engines for the 2007 Sebring; the  GEMA I4, the  EER V6, and the  EGF V6. The 3.5 L V6 is coupled to Chrysler's first ever six-speed automatic transmission, which employs Autostick technology, and the 2.7 L V6 is capable of running on cleaner-burning E85. Export vehicles will be offered with a 2.0 L turbocharged PDTDI (pumpe düse) diesel made by Volkswagen and the 2.0 L GEMA engine. The 3.5 L V6 sedan is available with all-wheel drive as an extra cost option for 2008 only.

Trim levels:
base — 2007
LX — 2008 (replaced base)
Touring — (2007–2010)
Limited AWD — (2008)
Limited — (2007–2010)

In 2008, the optional MyGIG Multimedia Infotainment System became available. In addition, the Limited received the 2.4 L four-cylinder engine and was priced at the same level as the 2008 Touring model. Also for 2009, the rear badge placements were modified. For the model 2010 year, the hood was redesigned, eliminating the longitudinal grooves. The IIHS gave the 2010 Models a G for good in the frontal crash test, the side impact test, and the roof strength test, giving the 2010 Sebring a Top Safety Pick.

Convertible

For the 2008 model year, the Sebring convertible was redesigned with hood strakes recalling the Chrysler Crossfire. The new convertible body style debuted at the 2007 Los Angeles International Auto Show as an early-2008 model. It was the second bestselling four-place open-top cars in the United States, trailing only the Ford Mustang convertible.

The new convertible offered both a retractable hardtop and soft tops, with the Sebring's roofs manufactured by Karmann. A vinyl top came on the base LX model, a cloth roof on the Touring and Limited models with the option of a retractable metal top. The convertible top retracts into the trunk with a power tonneau cover and a luggage protector for the top. The top can also be retracted with the remote keyless entry, meaning the top can be stowed without being inside the car or starting the engine.

The LX model included a new 2.4 L I4 engine, the Touring version came with a retuned version of the 2.7 L V6, while the Limited featured a new 3.5 L V6. Unlike the Sebring sedan, the convertible was not available in all-wheel drive.

Chinese versions

Production of the Chrysler Sebring sedan for the China market began in 2007 at the Beijing-Benz DaimlerChrysler Automotive Co. (BBDC) in Beijing. BBDC is a joint venture between the Beijing Automotive Industry Holding and Chrysler.

Production of the Sebring leveraged assembly capacity for the new BBDC plant which also built the Chrysler 300C, the Mercedes-Benz E-Class, and Mitsubishi Outlander.

Four-cylinder World Engines for the Sebring were built at the Global Engine Manufacturing Alliance (GEMA) plant in Dundee, Michigan for export to China. GEMA began as a joint venture of Chrysler, Mitsubishi, and Hyundai. Since 2009, GEMA is wholly owned by Chrysler.

European version
Chrysler introduced this generation Sebring in the European markets (including right-hand drive markets) as their first competitor in the D-segment. It received a generally unfavorable reception from European motoring journalists.

European reviews
Auto Express 	
Caradisiac  	
Honest John 
MSN Cars 	
Parker's 	
Verdict On Cars 	
Wise Buyer's

Mid-cycle refresh and replacement

The Chrysler Sebring was extensively refreshed in 2010, but was rebadged as the Chrysler 200. The JS platform and bodyshell had been retained, but there were extensive cosmetic and powertrain changes to the vehicle. The name change helped distance the vehicle from the Sebring's reputation for quality issues and fleet pervasiveness.

Total U.S. sales

Notes

References

External links

 Official Sedan Website
 Official Convertible Website

Sebring
Front-wheel-drive vehicles
Flexible-fuel vehicles
Mid-size cars
Coupés
Hardtop convertibles
Convertibles
Sedans
2000s cars
2010s cars
Cars introduced in 1995
Partial zero-emissions vehicles